Baba Budan was a 17th-century Sufi, revered by both Muslims and Hindus, whose shrine is at Baba Budangiri, Chikkamagalur, Karnataka, India. He is said to have introduced the coffee plant to India by bringing seven raw beans from the port of Mocha, Yemen while coming back from hajj in 1670. In those days coffee was exported to other parts of the world in roasted or baked form so that no one could grow their own and were forced to buy from the Yemenis. He brought seven beans because the number 7 is considered sacred in Islam. The coffee plants were then raised at the place that bears his name.

Popular Indian lore says that on a pilgrimage to Mecca in the 17th century Baba Budan, a revered Sufi saint from Karnataka state, discovered for himself the wonders of coffee. In his eagerness to grow coffee himself at home, he smuggled seven coffee beans out of the Yemeni port of Mocha which were hidden in his beard. On his return home, he planted the beans on the slopes of the Chandradrona hills in Chikkamagaluru  district, Kingdom of Mysore (present day Karnataka). This hill range was later named after him as the Baba Budangiri (Baba Budan Hills), where his tomb can be visited by taking a short trip from Chikmagalur.

See also
Coffee production in India
History of coffee
Coffee Board of India

References
 Coffee: A Dark History by Antony Wild. New York: Fourth Estate Press, 2004. 
District: Chickmagalur – State: Karnataka
Pendergrast, Mark, Uncommon Grounds: The History of Coffee and How It Transformed Our World, (New York: Basic Book, 1999).
 Bhattacharya, Bhaswati. Local History of a Global Commodity: Production of Coffee in Mysore and Coorg in the Nineteenth Century. Indian Historical Review 41, no. 1 (2014): 67-86.

Indian Sufi saints
Indian hermits
Year of birth unknown
Year of death unknown
Coffee in India